Muamer Jahić (born 1 December 1979) is a Bosnian retired football player.

Club career
He was part of the Željezničar Sarajevo squad during the 1995/96 season and he later won promotion to Bosnia's top tier with Olimpik.

International career
He made two appearances for Bosnia and Herzegovina at the August 2001 LG Cup, an unofficial match against South Africa and an official international match against Iran.

References

External links

Profile - NFSBIH

1979 births
Living people
People from Srebrenica
Association football midfielders
Bosnia and Herzegovina footballers
Bosnia and Herzegovina international footballers
FK Željezničar Sarajevo players
FK Olimpik players
NK Bosna Visoko players
Premier League of Bosnia and Herzegovina players